"Love Was on Our Side" is a single by Canadian country music group Family Brown. Released in 1979, it was a single from their album Familiar Faces, Familiar Places. The song reached number one on the RPM Country Tracks chart in Canada in March 1980.

Chart performance

References

1979 singles
Family Brown songs
RCA Records singles